Beluncle Halt was a halt on the Hundred of Hoo Railway between Sharnal Street station and Middle Stoke halt. It was opened in July 1906 and closed to passengers on 4 December 1961. Although officially called Beluncle Halt the nameboard simply read Beluncle.

References

Sources

External links
 Subterranea Britannica
 Beluncle Halt station on navigable 1940 O. S. map

Disused railway stations in Kent
Former South Eastern Railway (UK) stations
Railway stations in Great Britain opened in 1906
Railway stations in Great Britain closed in 1961
1906 establishments in England
1961 disestablishments in England
Transport in Medway